Edward Joseph Murphy (August 23, 1918 – December 10, 1991) was a Major League Baseball first baseman who played for the Philadelphia Phillies during the  season.

External links

1918 births
1991 deaths
Major League Baseball first basemen
Philadelphia Phillies players
Minor league baseball managers
Albany Travelers players
Allentown Wings players
Americus Phillies players
Columbus Red Birds players
Elmira Pioneers players
Grand Forks Chiefs players
Memphis Chickasaws players
Portsmouth Red Birds players
Salt Lake City Bees players
Terre Haute Phillies players
Trenton Packers players
Union City Greyhounds players
Wilkes-Barre Barons (baseball) players
Wilmington Blue Rocks players
Baseball players from Illinois
Sportspeople from Joliet, Illinois